Grozești is a commune in Iași County, Western Moldavia, Romania. It is composed of three villages: Colțu Cornii, Grozești and Sălăgeni.

References

Communes in Iași County
Localities in Western Moldavia
Populated places on the Prut